Puya is a genus of the botanical family Bromeliaceae. It is the sole genus of the subfamily Puyoideae, and is composed of 226 species. These terrestrial plants are native to the Andes Mountains of South America and southern Central America.  Many of the species are monocarpic, with the parent plant dying after one flower and seed production event.

The species Puya raimondii is notable as the largest species of bromeliad known, reaching 3 m tall in vegetative growth with a flower spike 9–10 m tall. The other species are also large, with the flower spikes mostly reaching 1–4 m tall.

The name Puya was derived from the Mapuche Indian word meaning "point".

Taxonomy
The genus is commonly divided into two subgenera, Puya, containing eight species, and Puyopsis containing the remainder. The subgenera can be distinguished by the presence of a sterile inflorescence at the branch apex in Puya, which are fertile in Puyopsis.

Species
, Plants of the World Online accepted the following species:

Cultivation and use
Some species of Puya in Chile, locally known as chagual, are used to make salads from the base of its young leaves or stem. A common species is Puya chilensis.

References

External links
Puya raimondii photos
 Pictures of Puya chilensis, Puya berteroniana, Puya coerulea and Puya venusta growing in Chile.
BSI Genera Gallery photos

 
Bromeliaceae genera
Páramo flora